Plamen Alexandrov (born 20 March 1961) is a Bulgarian swimmer. He competed in two events at the 1980 Summer Olympics.

References

External links

1961 births
Living people
Bulgarian male swimmers
Olympic swimmers of Bulgaria
Swimmers at the 1980 Summer Olympics
Place of birth missing (living people)